di Lorenzo or Di Lorenzo is an Italian surname. Notable people with the surname include:

 Francesca Di Lorenzo (born 1997), American tennis player
 Giovanni di Lorenzo (born 1959), Italian-German journalist
 Giovanni Di Lorenzo (born 1993), Italian footballer
 Rossana Di Lorenzo (born 1938), Italian actress
 Tina Di Lorenzo (1872–1930), Italian actress

Italian-language surnames
Patronymic surnames
Surnames from given names